The 1967 PGA Tour season was played from January 12 to December 3, and consisted of 40 official money events. Jack Nicklaus won the most tournaments, five, and there were five first-time winners. Nicklaus was the leading money winner with earnings of $188,998. Nicklaus was voted the PGA Player of the Year and Arnold Palmer won the Vardon Trophy for the lowest scoring average.

Schedule
The following table lists official events during the 1967 season.

Unofficial events
The following events were sanctioned by the PGA Tour, but did not carry official money, nor were wins official.

Money leaders
The money list was based on prize money won during the season, calculated in U.S. dollars.

Awards

Notes

References

External links
PGA Tour official site

PGA Tour seasons
PGA Tour